The following lists events that happened during 2006 in the Democratic Republic of São Tomé and Príncipe.

Incumbents
President: Fradique de Menezes
Prime Minister: Maria do Carmo Silveira (until 21 April), Tomé Vera Cruz (from 21 April)

Events
Parque Natural Obô de São Tomé and Parque Natural Obô do Príncipe created
25 March: the São Toméan legislative election took place
April: the XI Constitutional Government of São Tomé and Príncipe began
18 May - Francisco da Silva succeeded Dionísio Tomé Dias as President of the National Assembly
20 June: João Paulo Cassandra becomes President of the Regional Government of Príncipe
30 July: the São Toméan presidential election took place
5 October: José Cassandra becomes President of the Regional Government of Príncipe

References

 
Years of the 21st century in São Tomé and Príncipe
2000s in São Tomé and Príncipe
São Tomé and Príncipe
São Tomé and Príncipe